Lansing McLoskey (born 1964) is an American composer of contemporary classical music. His Zealot Canticles: An Oratorio for Tolerance was a winner of the 61st Annual Grammy Award for Best Choral Performance by the ensemble The Crossing. McLoskey serves as a Professor of Music at the Frost School of Music in Miami, Florida. Among McLoskey's numerous commissions are those from Guerilla Opera, Copland House, The Fromm Foundation, The Barlow Endowment, N.E.A., The Crossing, ensemberlino vocale, New Spectrum Foundation, Ensemble Berlin PianoPercussion, Passepartout Duo, the Boston Choral Ensemble, and Kammerkoret NOVA.

Early life 

McLoskey was born to Robert and JoAnn McLoskey in 1964. His grandfather, Heinrich "Henry" L. Hansen was born in Denmark. Growing up in Cupertino, California, Lansing came from a musical family. His mother minored in piano performance at Cal State Fresno, his father played saxophone, and his grandfather, Illinois congressman Robert T. McLoskey, played violin in a regional orchestra. As a teenager, McLoskey learned to play piano, guitar, and saxophone. He started writing rock songs at 14, after purchasing an electric guitar from a flea market. Following high school, McLoskey studied abroad as a student at Holte Gymnasium outside of Copenhagen, Denmark, where he learned to speak Danish.

Although his tastes were eclectic, he found himself drawn to music outside the mainstream, including Prog Rock, Punk Rock, Industrial, Goth, No-Wave, and Post-Punk. He immersed himself in the hardcore punk scene in the San Francisco Bay Area, and played in several punk, surf, goth-dance, and experimental bands in high school and college, including The Suburban Lemmings, The Minority, The Bruces, Spangled Blew, and a “punk opera” project he co-wrote, called "Stanly in the Sewer.” Around this time, McLoskey had a spiritual awakening and dropped his musical pursuits to serve an LDS mission in Denmark.

Education 

McLoskey applied to UC Santa Barbara while on his mission. Initially planning on majoring in piano performance, McLoskey was taken aback when he heard, in the same week, Luciano Berio's Sinfonia, Igor Stravinsky's Rite of Spring, and "Non al suo amante" by the trecento Italian composer Jacopo da Bologna. These experiences inspired him to shift his focus from piano to composition. They also marked the beginning of his love for early music. “Early music performance was one of the most important things in my life from undergraduate through my doctoral studies and beyond, and it started at UC Santa Barbara,” said McLoskey. He joined Capella Cordina, the early music choir at UCSB directed by Alejandro Planchart, changed his major to composition, and completed a BA in Composition in 1989. McLoskey considers his string quartet flux in situ (1989, rev. 1991) as his first representative piece.

During his Masters’ studies at the USC Thornton School of Music, McLoskey continued both his composition work as well as his love for early music. He studied composition with Stephen Hartke and Donald Crockett, and counterpoint with Morten Lauridsen. Along with several master's students in early music performance, McLoskey founded the vocal sextet Clamores Antiqui. He also studied early music voice at The Amherst Early Music Festival and Workshop.

After completing his master's, McLoskey worked for four years at a home automation and systems integration company in Santa Monica called Sound Solutions. His company let him take time off to pursue music. In 1993 he was an American-Scandinvavian Foundation Fellow at Det Kongelige Danske Musikkonservatorium (the Royal Danish Academy of Music), where he studied composition with Ib Nørholm, and contemporary & Renaissance choral techniques with composer/conductor Bo Holten and Ars Nova Copenhagen. In 1994 he attended the Advanced Masters Program at the Aspen Music Festival and School, where he worked with Jacob Druckman and Bernard Rands, which led to McLoskey’s attending Harvard University for his doctorate. He also taught music theory and aural skills at The Crossroads School for the Arts in Santa Monica, CA.

During this time, McLoskey met, dated and married his wife, Kathleen Jordan. In 1995, the couple moved to Boston both to pursue degrees: McLoskey, a Ph.D. at Harvard, and his wife, her undergraduate, master's degree and artist diploma in opera performance. As a composition student at Harvard, McLoskey studied with Mario Davidovsky and Bernard Rands. He also continued to pursue his love for early music and his interest in contemporary Danish music and composers. He took courses in early music performance at the Longy School of Music, studied voice with mezzo-soprano Laurie Monahan of Ensemble P.A.N. (Project Ars Nova) fame, published a book on 20th century Danish composers, presented papers and published an article on 20th century Danish music, and was awarded the Einar & Eva Haugen Award for Scandinavian Studies. 

After having three children while still pursuing all these interests, his wife told him, “You can’t be a composer, singer, conductor, musicologist, and a father and husband. Something’s got to give.” Accordingly, he cut back on his early music performance and all his Danish musical research. Still, McLoskey remained busy with a variety of projects, including writing his dissertation; giving private lessons; teaching at Harvard, Wellesley, and Longy; holding two church jobs as a singer and organist; and running a skateboard company called Latter-Day Skates for eight years.

Personal life 

McLoskey married Kathleen Jordan in 1995. They have three children: Kyrie, born 1996; twins Degan and Kai, born 1999. As a practicing member of the LDS Church, McLoskey does not smoke or drink alcohol or coffee. He is an avid surfer, cyclist, and fly fisherman.

Career 

After completing his Ph.D., McLoskey taught for three years as a Lecturer at Harvard, and had Visiting Professor appointments at Wellesley College and Longy School of Music, Cambridge, MA. McLoskey joined the faculty of the University of Miami’s Frost School of Music in 2005, where he is currently a Full Professor of Composition and Theory. McLoskey’s students include American composers Peter Van Zandt Lane, Ben Morris, and Benjamin Webster, Italian composer Alessandra Salvati, and Brazilian composer Rodrigo Bussad. While at Frost, he formed, conducted, and sang with The Other Voices, a vocal ensemble performing medieval, Renaissance, and 20th/21st century repertoire. 

McLoskey's music has been performed in 22 countries on six continents. He is the recipient of over 50 national and international composition awards, prizes, and fellowships, including the 2011 Goddard Lieberson Fellowship from the American Academy of Arts and Letters, awarded to “a composer of exceptional gifts.” McLoskey also holds the distinction of being the only composer in the 56 year history of the Contemporary Music Festival to win both the orchestral and chamber music competitions (awarded by two independent, blind juries).

He has been commissioned by the National Endowment for the Arts, Pew Charitable Trusts, the Barlow Endowment, The Fromm Foundation, Aaron Copland House, Meet The Composer, ASCAP & SCI (the Society of Composers, Inc.), the MATA Festival, The Crossing, King's Chapel (Boston), New Spectrum Foundation for Miranda Cuckson, Guerilla Opera, the International Joint Wind Quintet Project, Network for New Music (Philadelphia), The Alba Music Festival (Italy), the soundSCAPE Festival (Italy), Passepartout Duo (Berlin), Ensemble Berlin PianoPercussion, Calyx Trio, ensemberlino vocale, Kammerkoret NOVA (Oslo, Norway), Splinter Reeds, [Switch~ Ensemble], Liber, Dinosaur Annex Ensemble, the newEar Ensemble (Kansas City), TAWA Sax Quartet (Lima, Peru), The Calcutta Chamber Orchestra, internationally award-winning violinists Miclen Laipang and Linda Wang, oboist ToniMarie Marchioni, violist Leticia Oaks-Strong of the Los Angeles Philharmonic, and many others.

McLoskey has lectured and given masterclasses at over thirty schools and festivals, including the Aspen Music Festival & School, the Aspen Institute, the Tanglewood Institute, Universität der Künste Berlin, Conservatorio Nacional de Música (Mexico), and two dozen universities. He has been the Composer-in-Residence at the Alba Music Festival (Italy), the soundSCAPE festival (Italy), the Charlotte New Music Festival, the Missouri Chamber Music Festival, the Carolina Chamber Music Festival, Piccolo Spoleto Festival, and the Webster University Young Composers Workshop.

While in Boston McLoskey was a member and then President of Composers in Red Sneakers. He has also served on the Board of Advisors of The Barlow Endowment for Music Composition, the Center for LDS Arts, and the Bogliasco Foundation.

Notable performances

International festivals to include McLoskey's music include The 2017 Huddersfield Contemporary Music Festival (UK); XXXV Foro Internacional Música Nueva, Mexico City, Mexico; The Dimlicht Festival, Antwerp, Belgium; ClarinetFest 2018 (International Clarinet Conference), Ostend, Belgium; The Gaudeamus Festival 2021, Utrecht, Belgium; Now Hear This Festival, Edmonton, Canada; International Voila Congress, Guelph, Canada; Il Jornadas Musicales de Invierno 2018 (Winter Music Days Festival), Talca, Chile; The XXX Festival de Musica Contemporànea Habana, Cuba; The I Festival Nacional de Metales de Bogotá, Colombia; Nordic Saxophone Festival, Aarhus, Denmark; The Lieksa Brass Festival, Finland; The World Saxophone Congress, Strasbourg, France; 2021 Zodiac International Music Competition, France; Amicidella Musicadi Modena AdAdM Festival, Modena, Italy; The Contrasti Festival, Trento, Italy; The Alba Music Festival, Italy; Skammdegi Festival, Ólafsfjördur, Iceland; Myrkir Músíkdagar (Dark Music Days Festival), Reykjavik, Iceland; 2020 Hovlandfestivalen, Oslo, Norway; XVIII International Jazz Festival, Lima, Peru; XVIII Ciclo de Música Contemporánea, Málaga, Spain; ENSEMS International Festival of Contemporary Music of Valencia, Spain; 2019 İTÜ/MIAM Piano Festival II, Istanbul, Turkey; 2019 ACMF (Ashburton Chamber Music Festival), Ashburton, UK.

His Suite hypnagogique was premiered by pianist Scott Holden at Carnegie Hall on June 29, 2018 as part of the Mormon Arts Center Festival. Spectrum in New York City held a two-day "McLoskey Festival," April 15-16, 2016.

Awards, fellowships, honors 

 2022 Copland House Fellow & Award
 Zealot Canticles: An Oratorio for Tolerance, 2019 GRAMMY Award for Best Choral Performance by The Crossing; Donald Nally, conductor
 The Captivity of Hannah Duston, Finalist for the 2020 AML (Association for Mormon Letters) Award for Drama
 2019 Bogliasco Foundation Fellow
 2nd Prize, the 2019 American Prize, for Zealot Canticles
 Winner, the 2019 Analog Choral Composition Competition
 Winner, the 2018 Boston Choral Ensemble Composition Commission Competition
 2018 Copland House Award and recipient of their annual commission
 The 2016 American Prize for Choral Composition, for Qumran Psalms
 2016, Winner, the Robert Avalon International Competition for Composers, for Discipline
 MacDowell Colony fellow, 2011 and 2015
 2014, First Prize, the Red Note Festival Composition Competition, for Specific Gravity: 2.72
 2014 GMA (Global Music Award) Bronze Medal for What We Do Is Secret
 What We Do Is Secret, first round submission for a 2013 Grammy for Best Contemporary Classical Composition
 2013 Aaron Copland Recording Grant
 2012, Grand Prize Winner, The Chatham Baroque Composition Competition, for Haute Dance
 The 2011 Goddard Lieberson Fellowship from the American Academy of Arts and Letters, awarded to a “composer of exceptional gifts.”
 Winner, 2011 International Joint Wind Quintet Composition Competition
 Winner, The International Music Prize for Excellence in Music Composition 2011, for What We Do Is Secret
 First Prize, 2009 Indianapolis Chamber Orchestra Composition Competition, for Requiem, v.2.001x
 Winner, 2009 “Music Now” Composition Competition, ISU New Music Festival, for Processione di lacrime
 Winner, 2009 First Annual newEar Composition Competition, for Requiem, v.2.001
 Winner, 2009 & 2010 American Composers Forum-LA Composition Competition, for Yellow and Sudden Music
 Co-Winner, The Chicago Ensemble’s Discover America IV Competition, 2001, for Wild Bells
 First Prize, SCI/ASCAP 2000 National Student Composition Competition, for Wild Bells
 The Francis Boott Prize for Vocal Works, 2000
 First Prize, 1999 Omaha Symphony Orchestra International New Music Competition, for Prex Penitentialis
 2000 Lee Ettelson Composers Award from Composers, Inc., for Wild Bells
 1999, First Prize, The Paris New Music Review International Competition “60 Seconds”, for Theft
 1999, First Prize, The 5th Annual Boston Chamber Ensemble International Composition Contest, for Prex Penitentialis
 The 1999 George Arthur Knight Prize, for Tinted
 The 1998 Adelbert Sprague Prize for Orchestral Works, for Prex Penitentialis
 Charles Ives Scholarship, the American Academy of Arts and Letters, 1998
 Co-winner, 1996 Charles Ives Center Orchestral Competition, for Moraine
 Winner, 1996 ASCAP Grants to Young Composers Competition, for Occam’s Razor (cello concerto)
 First Prize, 1995 Kenneth Davenport National Competition for Orchestral Works, for Moraine
 1991 Phi Kappa Phi Award for Creative or Scholarly Work, for Symphoniae Sacrae.

Music 

Significant works

Five years in the making, McLoskey’s 2017 oratorio Zealot Canticles: An Oratorio for Tolerance is the composer’s largest, most ambitious piece. Composed for the Philadelphia-based choir The Crossing, the 80-minute-long work calls for 3 soloists, choir, and chamber ensemble. When McLoskey picked the work’s texts by Nobel prize-winning author Wole Soyinka in 2012, he did not conceive how timely their message of tolerance would become half a decade later. “It was really a powerful and bittersweet experience to be writing this,” McLoskey said. “It felt sadly so apropos. Its message is not just about American politics. It’s universal,” citing the rise of open bigotry, racism, violence since 2016.

For its timeliness and scope, McLoskey considers the oratorio his magnum opus. It was released on CD on Innova in 2018.

The most noteworthy of McLoskey’s instrumental large ensemble works is his concerto for brass quintet, What We Do Is Secret (2011). The titles of the concerto’s movements are all drawn from punk songs, although no punk music is ever quoted. Whereas the meaning of Zealot Canticles is universal and urgent, What We Do Is Secret has a much more personal genesis. McLoskey has explained the “formative, transforming experience” punk music had on him when he said, “Second to going on a mission, discovering punk rock changed my life more than anything else.” What We Do Is Secret was awarded several composition awards.

Among McLoskey’s chamber music, the 1999 duo for viola and piano, Wild Bells, stands out both for its emotional impact and its technical composition. McLoskey cites this work as the one piece that exhibits his voice in a clear way. It sits at the crossroads of all his major artistic trajectories: “(1) The use, roles, and perception of consonance and dissonance (particularly the consonant use of dissonance and the dissonant use of consonance), (2) juxtaposition and non-traditional trajectories, (3) Neo-Heterophony, and (4) the incorporation of pre-tonal concepts, music, and techniques in a contemporary setting (perhaps an inevitable result of my years involved in the performance of medieval and Renaissance repertoire).”

Though McLoskey has composed for every genre, he has a special interest in choral and vocal music. He has written for and been performed by some of the elite choral ensembles in the world, including The Crossing, Cincinnati Vocal Arts Ensemble, Borg Vokal (Norway), ensemberlino vocale (Berlin), Volti, Boston Choral Ensemble, Kammerkoret NOVA (Oslo, Norway), Chorosynthesis, C4, Boston Secession, Tapestry, Liber, NOTUS (the Indiana University Contemporary Vocal Ensemble), the Melbourne Chamber Choir (Australia), and The Hilliard Ensemble.

A noteworthy choral work is You Have a Name and a Place (2019); a choral cycle commissioned by Boston Choral Ensemble as the Winner of their 2018 International Composition Competition. The three movement work sets texts by and about gay Mormons, and was premiered by Stare At The Sun (Chicago) in March of 2022, following a two year delay caused by the COVID-19 pandemic.

Many of McLoskey's works deal with social justice, politics, and human rights, including Agitprop, Resist, post/resist, Zealot Canticles, You Have a Name and a Place, and The Task Ahead Is Enormous, and There Is Not Much Time.

Much of McLoskey's work -- both instrumental and vocal -- is sacred in nature, albeit for non-liturgical use. McLoskey draws little distinction between "sacred" and "secular" music. Examples of significant sacred works are Symphoniæ Sacræ, an orchestral setting of various sacred texts; Prex Penitentialis: The Prayer of Petrarch - commissioned by the N.E.A. for soprano & orchestra, and the winner of three awards including the Omaha Symphony Orchestra International New Music Competition and the 5th Annual Boston Chamber Ensemble International Composition Contest, setting excepts of Petrarch's "Septem psalmi penitentialis” and “Canzoniere”; and […]Qumran Psa[lms…], a choral cycle for triple choir, setting fragments of lost psalms from the Dead Sea Scrolls, commissioned by ensemberlino vocale and awarded the 2016 American Prize for Choral Composition.

His 50-minute work for mezzo-soprano and sinfonietta One Book Called Ulysses (2022) was commissioned by Network for New Music, the Barlow Endowment, and the Musical Fund of Philadelphia for the 100th anniversary of James Joyce's Ulysses.

His opera The Captivity of Hannah Duston (2020), with a libretto by Glen Nelson, was commissioned by the Barlow Endowment and Guerilla Opera (Boston)

Selected work list 
Large ensemble, concerti, opera

Symphoniæ Sacræ (1991) - orchestra
 Occam's razor (1992, rev. 2018) - cello concerto
 Moraine (1995) - orchestra
 Prex Penitentiales: The Prayer of Petrarch (1997) - soprano & chamber orchestra
 Chanson pour cordes (1999) - string orchestra
 Requiem, v.2.001x (2001) - orchestra
 SLAM! (2007) - orchestra
 What We Do Is Secret (2011) - concerto for brass quintet & wind ensemble
 Zealot Canticles: An Oratorio for Tolerance (2017) - soprano, mezzo, baritone soloists, SATB, clarinet, SATB
 …que la tierra se partió por su sonido (2018) - concerto for flute & flute ensemble
 post/resist (2020) - orchestra, electronics
 The Captivity of Hannah Duston (2020) - opera w/libretto by Glen Nelson
 One Book Called Ulysses (2022) - mezzo-soprano & sinfonietta/chamber orchestra
 I Heard the Children Singing (2023) - violin concerto

Chamber works

 flux in situ (1989, rev. 1991) - string quartet
 Star Chamber (1992) - solo violin
 Rosetta Stone (1995) - fl, cl, vn or vla, vc, pno, perc
 Plaindance (1996) - ob/eng, cl, vla, vc, cb
 Theft (1996) - piano (w/speaking pianist)
 Tinted (1998) - piano trio
 zámbáah (1998) - fl/a.fl, cl, vn, vc, pno
 Wild Bells (1999) - viola & piano
 Glaze (2000) - brass quintet & drum kit
 Requiem, v.2.001 (2000) - fl, cl, vn, vc, pno, perc
 Glisten (2004) - piano trio
 B(ee) Movie (2007) - cello, marimba, video
 OK-OK (2006) - sax quartet
 Yellow (2006) - fl, cl, vn, vc, pno
 The Madding Crowd (2007) - brass quintet
 Catherine's Wheel (2007) - violin, marimba
 Quartettrope (2008) - cl, a.sax, vn, pno
 blur (2009) - clarinet and basset horn or alto sax
 Sudden Music (2009) - song cycle for soprano & piano
 Processione di lacrime (2009) - a.sax, vn, vla, vc
 Hardwood (2011) - wind quintet
 Specific Gravity: 2.72 (2012) - fl, cl, a.sax, vn, vc, perc
 Haute Dance (2012) - Baroque violin, tenor viola da gamba, and theorbo
 Rite (2014) - two pianos & two percussion
 Two (2015) - solo violin
 Discipline (2015) - oboe & piano
 Whirl (2015) - clarinet & alto sax
 Sikurtawa (2015) - sax quartet
 Agitprop (2017) - bass clarinet, marimba, electronics
 This Will Not Be Loud and Relentless (2017) - muted piano & muted snare drum
 #playlist (2018) - reed quintet
 Suite hypnagogique (2018) - solo piano
 Mühlfeldtänze (2018) - clarinet quintet
 The Task Ahead is Enormous, and There is Not Much Time (2020) - piccolo, violin, piano, percussion

Choral and vocal works

 Non avrá ma’ pieta (1991) - solo SATTBB voices
 O mira novitas (1999) - solo SSA voices
 Solsange (2001) - solo SAT voices
 Breake, blowe, burn (2001) - SATB, 2 percussion
 Riddle (2001) - solo ATTB voices
 Burning Chariots (2003) - SATB
 Venite, sancti venite (2009) - SATB
 The Memory of Rain (2010) - SATB & organ
 Unreal City (2011) - soprano, piano, percussion 
 Zealot Canticle (2011) - SATB w/clarinet 
 Dear World (2015) - SATB
 […]Qumran Psa[lms…] (2015) - SATB (triple choir)
 You Have a Name and a Place (2019) - SATB
 Sette grime på natta ("Harnessing the Night") (2019) - SATB (in Norwegian)
 On Fire Today (2021) - baritone & string quartet
 Shout in the Street (2022) - mezzo-soprano, flute, and piano
 One Book Called Ulysses (2022) - mezzo-soprano & sinfonietta
McLoskey’s music is published by Theodore Presser Company, Inc., American Composers Alliance Press (ACA), Marimba Productions, Inc., Odhecaton Z Music, and Subito Music Publishing.

Discography 
Solo or "featured" CDs
Zealot Canticles (Innova Recordings #984), 2018
Specific Gravity: Chamber Music by Lansing McLoskey (Albany Records TROY1443), 2013
The Unheard Music: New American Music for Wind Ensemble and Brass (Albany Records, TROY1442), 2013
Sixth Species (Albany Records, TROY1044), 2008. CD of McLoskey's chamber music. 
Works on compilation discs
Kammerkoret NOVA: Of Light and Dust (LAWO, LAWO1168.2), 2019. Includes Dear World.
Analog Chorale: Explorers (Avant-Garde), 2019. Includes Dear World.
Frost Symphony Orchestra Live (Albany Records TROY1750), 2018. Includes Chanson pour cordes. 

Rita Blitt: Visions of My World” DVD (Equilibrium/Soundset, DVD06, NSR-1000407), 2014. Includes blur.
Citizens of Nowhere (Albany Records, TROY1439), 2013. Includes blur.
An American Dream/Prex Penitentialis (Albany Records, TROY1258) 2011. Includes Prex Penitentialis.
Metamorphosis (Beauport Classical, BC1805), 2009. Includes Star Chamber.
Glisten (Albany Records, TROY886), 2006. Includes Glisten.
Mormoniana (Tantara Records/Mormon Artists Group), 2004. Includes Untitled (Corner Grid).
Cornucopia (Capstone Records), 2003. Includes Breake, blowe, burn.
Don't Panic! 60 Seconds for Piano (Wergo Schallplatten), 2001
Cultivated Choruses (Capstone Records), 2000. Includes Non avrá ma' pieta.

Publications 
McLoskey published a book titled Twentieth Century Danish Music which serves as a research guide on the topic. His research on the subject was awarded the Haug Prize for Scandinavian Studies.

External links 
Lansing McLoskey's bio on American Composers Alliance

Lansing McLoskey's SoundCloud page

Playlist of most of McLoskey's commercially released CDs on Spotify

McLoskey, Lansing. Twentieth Century Danish Music. London: Greenwood Publishing Group, 1998.

Moore, Tom. "A Conversation with Composer Lansing McLoskey". Sonograma Magazine. Accessed March 20, 2018.

Lansing McLoskey's faculty bio at the Frost School of Music, University of Miami

References

American classical composers
Living people
1964 births
USC Thornton School of Music alumni
University of California, Santa Barbara alumni
Harvard University alumni